The SV-18 is a Russian bolt-action bullpup anti-materiel rifle designed in 2019 by Kalashnikov Concern.

History 
A single-shot breechloading prototype of the SV-18 was first unveiled at ARMY-2017, an annual Russian military trade exhibition. At the next year's ARMY exhibition, the first instance of a magazine-fed, bolt-action design was seen, and the weapon was finalised in 2019.

Design 
One of the SV-18's requirements was that it weighed less than 10 kilograms, which led to it being designed as a bolt action, as the recoil created would have otherwise caused discomfort. A large muzzle brake is in place to reduce recoil.

The SV-18 contains a rail on top of the receiver, and M-LOK slots on the handguard, for the attachment of accessories.

See also 

 KSVK 12.7
 OSV-96
 SV-98

References 

12.7×108 mm sniper rifles
.50 BMG sniper rifles
12.7×108 mm anti-materiel rifles
Bolt-action rifles of Russia
Bullpup rifles
Sniper rifles of Russia
Kalashnikov Concern products
Weapons and ammunition introduced in 2019